Infanterie-Regiment Bremen (1. Hanseatisches) Nr. 75 was an active infantry regiment in the Prussian Army (1866–1871) and the German Imperial Army (1871–1918).

Organization

History 
By A.K.O. from September 27, 1866, which is considered the official foundation day of the regiment, a new regiment was formed after the Austro-Prussian War from companies of the Pomeranian Regiments No. 1, 3, 5 and 7 on November 3, 1866 in Stettin. It was formed into a musketeer battalion in Harburg and a fusilier battalion in Stade and called Infanterie-Regiment Nr. 75.

As a result of the military convention between Prussia and Bremen on June 27, 1867, the "Bremen" Fusilier Battalion, founded in 1813, was dissolved in the North German Confederation. From this point on, this battalion formed the 1st (musketeer) battalion of the regiment. From 1893 both musketeer battalions were stationed in Bremen, while the fusilier battalion remained in Stade. The regiment was renamed to 1. Hanseatisches Infanterie-Regiment Nr. 75.

Franco-Prussian War

Interwar period

First World War

Legacy
Several years after the war, former members of the regiment formed a veterans organization Kameradschaftsbund der Fünfundsiebziger (from 1939 to 1943: Traditionsverband des Ehem. Infant.-Reg. "Bremen" (1. Hans.) Nr. 75) which published a newsletter, Kameradschaftsbund der 75er.  There was also a separate officers association. Following the war, the regiment was perpetuated in the Reichswehr by 1. Kompanie/16. Infanterie-Regiment (6. Division, based in Münster).

Commanders

Notable members

See also
List of Imperial German infantry regiments

References

Sources
 anon. Bremer Verlustliste. Bremen: L. Mack, 1871.
 anon. Kurze Darstellung der Geschichte des Infanterie-Regiments Bremen (1. Hanseatischen) Nr. 75 von 1866 bis 1908. Berlin: Bajanz & Studer, 1908.
 anon. Infanterie-Regiment Bremen im Felde 1914–1918. Bremen: F. Leuwer, 1919.
 Caspari, Walter. Infanterie-Regiment "Bremen" (1. Hanseatisches) Nr 75: Die letzten Großkampftage am 29., 30., 31. Okt. u. 1. Nov. 1918 Bremen: F. Leuwer, [1921].
 Caspari, Walter. Infanterie-Regiment "Bremen" (1. Hanseatisches) Nr 75: Die Kämpfe im Oktober 1918 Bremen: C. Schünemann, [1923].
 Gottschling, G. R. L. Geschichte des 1. hanseatischen Infanterie-Regiments Nr. 75: von seiner Gründg im J. 1866 bis zum Ende d. dt.-franz. Krieges 1870/71. Berlin: Mittler, 1886.
 Zipfel, Ernst. Geschichte des Infanterie-Regiments Bremen (1. Hanseatisches) Nr. 75. Bremen: Hauschild, 1934.

Infantry regiments of the Prussian Army